The Central District of Zarrin Dasht County is a district (bakhsh) in Zarrin Dasht County, Fars Province, Iran. At the 2006 census, its population was 47,323, in 10,483 families.  The District has two cities: Hajjiabad and Dobiran. The District has three rural districts (dehestan): Dobiran Rural District, Khosuyeh Rural District, and Zirab Rural District.

References 

Zarrin Dasht County
Districts of Fars Province